Cuban Story: The Truth about Fidel Castro Revolution is a 1959 film documentary narrated by Errol Flynn, and the last known performance work of his career.

It was one of two films Flynn made about the Cuban Revolution during the early period when Castro was publicly denying his communist allegiance, the other being the drama-documentary Cuban Rebel Girls (1959).

Filmink called the film "surprisingly engrossing" although "technically the quality is poor."

References

External links
 

1959 films
1959 documentary films
Films shot in Cuba
Works about the Cuban Revolution
Films about the Cuban Revolution
1950s English-language films
American documentary films
1950s American films